Aziza is a 1980 Tunisian and Algerian drama film directed by Abdellatif Ben Ammar and produced by Hassen Daldoul.The film starring Yasmine Khlat, Raouf Ben Amor, Dalila Rames and Mohamed Zinet in the lead roles.

The film was screened at the Directors' Fortnight section of the 1980 Cannes Film Festival.

Cast
 Yasmine Khlat
 Raouf Ben Amor
 Dalila Rames
 Mohamed Zinet
 Taoufik Jebali
 Mouna Noureddine

References

External links
 

1980s Arabic-language films
1980 films
1980 drama films
Tunisian drama films
Algerian drama films